Percy Smith (30 March 1804 – 21 February 1876) was an English clergyman and first-class cricketer who played for Cambridge University in two matches in 1825, totalling 9 runs with a highest score of 9, holding one catch and taking 2 wickets.

References

Bibliography
 

19th-century English Anglican priests
English cricketers
English cricketers of 1787 to 1825
Cambridge University cricketers
1804 births
1876 deaths
Alumni of Trinity College, Cambridge
Sportspeople from Chichester